The Great Lakes XTBG-1 was an American prototype torpedo bomber, intended for service in the United States Navy as part of that service's plan to modernise its aerial striking force in the mid-1930s. The XTBG-1 was outperformed by the competing TBD Devastator, however, in addition to having instability problems and only a single prototype of the three-seat design was constructed during 1935.

Design
Featuring retractable landing gear and a fully enclosed weapons bay for its torpedo, the XTBG-1 had the unusual feature of the torpedo-aimer seated forward of the wing, in a small, enclosed compartment.

Specifications (XTBG-1)

See also

References

TB01G
Great Lakes TBG
Single-engined tractor aircraft
Biplanes
Carrier-based aircraft
Aircraft first flown in 1935